Paul Frank Hince (born 2 March 1945 in Manchester, England), is an English former footballer who played as a winger in the Football League. He played for the Division One championship-winning side in 1967–68. In January 2021 the football league took the decision to award Paul and 3 other former City players a championship winning medal for the 1967-68 season. Paul's was presented to his son at half time at the game between City and Burnley on 16th October 2021.

Biography

Paul Hince was a reporter with the Ashton News before commencing his football career at Old Trafford, but achieved most success scoring four goals and playing eleven games at cross town rivals Manchester City during the Mercer-Allison partnership in the 1967 – 1968 season. On retiring from the game Paul went back to journalism working for the Manchester Evening News as the City correspondent where he frequently referred to City as "God's own Club," and later became the Chief Sportswriter and England correspondent.

Paul is the author of the book Memories of a Failed Footballer and a Crap Journalist. Although undoubtedly a "True Blue" as a journalist, Paul was well known for upsetting both Manchester City and United fans in his weekly columns. During Press Conferences Alex Ferguson would regularly react badly to questions from Hince who was delighted when Ferguson responded asking him if he was all right, did he need any paracetamol, or should he call a psychiatrist. Paul retired from the Manchester Evening News in 2006 and later wrote a column for the internet based "football.co.uk" site and is still a prolific "internet" journalist.

References

External links
Paul Hince's Career

1945 births
Living people
English footballers
Footballers from Manchester
Association football wingers
Manchester City F.C. players
Charlton Athletic F.C. players
Bury F.C. players
Crewe Alexandra F.C. players
Macclesfield Town F.C. players
English Football League players